The solar furnace of Uzbekistan was built in 1981, and is located 45 kilometers away from Tashkent city. The furnace is the largest in Asia. It uses a curved mirror, or an array of mirrors, acting as a parabolic reflector, which can reach temperatures of up to 3,000 degrees Celsius. The solar furnace of Uzbekistan can be visited by anyone who is interested in solar energy and wants to see its distinctive construction.

About 

The heat which is produced by the solar furnace is considered to be very clean, without any pollutants. There are different ways of using this energy, such as hydrogen fuel production, foundry applications and high temperature testing. The solar furnace of Uzbekistan is sometimes called the Sun Institute of Uzbekistan. The furnace is a complex optical and mechanical construction, with 63 flat mirrors automatically controlled to track the sun in unison and redirect the solar thermal energy towards the crucible. The furnace was first opened in May 1981, and it is located 1100 meters above sea level. The furnace covers a huge area in the mountains, and consists of 4 complex subdivisions, which are: the main building of “Solar furnace of Uzbekistan”, heliostatic field, concentrator and manufacturing tower. The solar furnace of Uzbekistan was ready for use in 6 years, which means it was built between the years of 1981 and 1987. The place for the solar furnace of Uzbekistan was chosen carefully, because the sun shines there for 270 days a year. The small solar furnace at the complex has a diameter of 2 meters. The heliostatic field of the solar furnace of Uzbekistan currently consists of about 62 heliostats which are installed in a staggered order. The field uses 12090 mirrors in total, and is the largest concentrator in the world, with an area of 1849 square meters. The concentrator at the furnace uses 10,700 mirrors, and the southern part of the concentrator is covered with special sunscreens. The solar furnace of Uzbekistan is controlled by employees from the laboratory on the 6th floor, and the observation ground is located on the highest spot.

Location 
The solar furnace of Uzbekistan is located in Tashkent region, Parkent city, Republic of Uzbekistan.

Links 
Solar energy and technologies in Uzbekistan
Solar Furnace in Uzbekistan
Solar energy news in Uzbekistan
News about the solar institute in Uzbekistan
News about the solar technologies in Uzbekistan

See also 
Solar power tower
Solar thermal energy
Odeillo solar furnace

References 

Renewable energy power stations in Uzbekistan
Solar thermal energy
Buildings and structures in Uzbekistan
Industrial furnaces
1981 establishments in the Soviet Union
1980s establishments in Uzbekistan
Power stations built in the Soviet Union